Yang Chengfu or Yang Ch'eng-fu (1883–1936) is historically considered the best known teacher of the soft style martial art of Yang-style t'ai chi ch'uan (Yang-style Taijiquan).

Biography
Yang Chengfu was born into the famous Yang Taijiquan family, the son of Yang Chien-hou and grandson of Yang Luchan. With his older brother Yang Shao-hou (楊少侯) and colleagues Wu Jianquan (吳鑑泉) and Sun Lutang (孫錄堂), he was among the first teachers to offer T'ai chi ch'uan instruction to the general public at the Beijing Physical Culture Research Institute from 1914 until 1928. He moved to Shanghai in 1928.

Chengfu is known for having "smoothed" out the somewhat more vigorous training routine he learned from his family as well as emphasising a "large frame" or "Da Jia (大架)" with expansive movements in stepping and using large circular motions with the arms. His smooth, evenly paced large frame form and its hundreds of offshoots has been the standard for Yang-style t'ai chi ch'uan (and overwhelmingly in the public imagination for T'ai chi ch'uan in general) ever since.

Chengfu is the official author of two books on the style, Application methods of Taijiquan, published in 1931, and Essence and Applications of Taijiquan (Taijiquan Tiyong Quanshu), published in 1934.  His second book was translated into English in 2005.

Students and Descendants
His direct descendants, the many students he taught, and their students, have spread the art around the world.  Among Yang Chengfu's students were famous masters such as Tung Ying-chieh (Dong Yingjie, 董英杰; 1898–1961), Chen Weiming, Fu Zhongwen (Fu Chung-wen, 1903–1994), Li Yaxuan (李雅轩; 1894–1976) and Cheng Man-ch'ing. Each of them taught extensively, founding groups teaching T'ai chi to this day. Cheng Man-ch'ing, perhaps the most famous outside of China, significantly shortened and simplified the traditional forms Yang taught him after his teacher's passing, reportedly to make them more accessible to larger numbers of students.  Although Cheng's modifications are considered controversial by most other schools and are not recognized by the Yang family, Cheng Man-ch'ing is known as one of the first to teach T'ai chi ch'uan in the West.

His sons have continued to teach their father's Taijiquan, including his first son, the late Yang Zhenming (1910–1985) (a.k.a. Yang Shouzhong, Yang Shou-Chung, Yeung Shou-Chung; 楊守中), who brought Yang-style t'ai chi ch'uan to Hong Kong, his second son Yang Zhenji (born 1921, current head of the family), his third son, Yang Zhenduo (楊振鐸; born 1926), living in Shanxi Province, who is widely considered the most prominent of the Yang family T'ai chi ch'uan instructors living today, and his fourth son, Yang Zhen Guo, born in 1928, and living in Hebei Province, Handan City.

Bibliography

External links
 Yang Family Website
 Yang Cheng-Fu Biography

1883 births
1936 deaths
Chinese tai chi practitioners
Sportspeople from Beijing
Martial arts writers